Break the Ice may refer to:
"Break the Ice" (Britney Spears song), 2007
"Break the Ice", a song by Stratovarius on their album Twilight Time
"Break the Ice", a song by TNT on their album Knights of the New Thunder
"Break the Ice", a song by Accept released as a bonus track on the CD version of their album Eat the Heat
"Break the Ice", theme song of the 2012 Junior Eurovision Song Contest by Kim-Lian
Break the Ice (festival), a hardcore punk festival held in Melbourne, Australia in 2012–2014
Icebreaker (facilitation)

See also
Don't Break the Ice, a game manufactured by Milton Bradley
 Icebreaker (disambiguation)